Radio Radio TV Sleep is a live album by the Norwegian rock band BigBang, which was released in 2003.

Overview
The release contains two discs, one with recordings from some of their acoustic concerts, and the other a collection of live electric tracks. Two different releases were made, a regular one and a digipack limited edition. "Can't Find My Way Home" is Øystein Greni's favourite track which was written in the 60s by Steve Winwood then of the group Blind Faith.

The other non-LP electric tracks are "Wrong Number" (Girl In Oslo EP '00) and "Better Than Before" (Girl In Oslo Europe EP '01). Acoustic tracks "Old People" (New Glow EP '00) and "Smiling For" (Smiling For EP '01) are EP-only numbers. Remaining songs "Lights Go Out" and "Cry Right" were concert tunes never released before.

Radio Radio TV Sleep sold to platinum and became until then the most successful live album ever released in Norway. The video version of the album, known as Radio Radio TV Sleep DVD, features six tracks taken from each disc plus bonus material such as music videos and TV live, including a cover of Jimi Hendrix' Purple Haze which Øystein Greni played on Norwegian television at the age of twelve.

The album title refers to a cheatcode that could be applied onto hotel room TV remote controls to access pay-television.

Track listing

Disc 1 (electric disc)
 "Where the World Comes to an End" – 5:10
 "Heaven and Stars Above" – 5:33
 "Wild Bird" – 4:49
 "Sing and Dance" – 4:17
 "To the Mountains" – 5:20
 "Elephant Man" – 3:37
 "Wrong Number" – 4:01
 "Make a Circle" – 3:34
 "Something Special" – 4:23
 "Girl in Oslo" – 6:38
 "Long Distance Man" – 5:21
 "Better Than Before" – 6:23
 "How Do You Do?" – 3:50

Disc 2 (acoustic disc)
 "Frontside Rock'n'Roll" – 3:54
 "Long Distance Man" (with Taran Greni) – 4:21
 "Right Beside You" – 3:43
 "Old People" – 4:32
 "Street Parade" – 3:05
 "Lights Go Out" (with Taran Greni & Erik Tresselt) – 4:01
 "Smiling For" – 3:37
 "Cry Right" – 2:00
 "Summer Rain" – 3:28
 "Clouds Rolling By" – 4:56
 "Can't Find My Way Home" (Blind Faith cover) – 3:52

Personnel
Øystein Greni - Lead vocals, guitars, piano, mandolin, woodwinds, drums, percussion
Nikolai Eilertsen - Bass, organ, piano, harmonica, brass, percussion, vocals
Olaf Olsen - drums, percussion
Taran Greni - vocals
Erik Tresselt - vocals

References

Bigbang (Norwegian band) albums
2003 live albums